Paul Robert Florence (April 22, 1900 – May 28, 1986) was a catcher in Major League Baseball who played for the New York Giants in its 1926 season.

Career
Born in Chicago, Illinois, Florence graduated from Georgetown University, where he was a Hall of Fame selection in football, basketball and baseball. He was also a catcher inductee for football and baseball in the Loyola Academy Hall of Fame, as well as the catcher on the Rochester Red Wings all-time roster team, which is considered one of the best in International League history.

In addition to Rochester, Florence caught in the minors for the Baltimore Orioles, Indianapolis Indians and Milwaukee Brewers. In between he played one season with the Chicago Cardinals NFL team.

Afterwards, Florence worked during seven years as the general manager for the Birmingham Barons club of the Southern Association. Besides, he served as the assistant general manager of the Cincinnati Reds and also was one of the main organizers of the Houston Astros franchise in 1962, remaining in the organization as their chief scout until his retirement in 1983 at the age of 83.

Florence died in 1986 in Gainesville, Florida, aged 86.

External links

1900 births
1986 deaths
Baltimore Orioles (IL) players
Baseball players from Chicago
Basketball players from Chicago
Chicago Cardinals players
Cincinnati Reds scouts
Georgetown Hoyas baseball players
Georgetown Hoyas football players
Georgetown Hoyas men's basketball players
Houston Astros scouts
Indianapolis Indians players
Major League Baseball catchers
Milwaukee Brewers (minor league) players
New York Giants (NL) players
American men's basketball players